The W.D. Candland House, at 123 North 100 West in Mount Pleasant, Utah, was completed in 1904.  It was listed on the National Register of Historic Places in 2019.

The listing includes five contributing buildings and a contributing structure.  The house is a brick one-and-a-half story, central-block-with-projecting-bays type Victorian Eclectic-style home.

References

National Register of Historic Places in Sanpete County, Utah
Houses completed in 1904